Pycnarmon argyria is a moth in the family Crambidae. It was described by Arthur Gardiner Butler in 1879. It is found in Hokkaido, Japan.

References

Spilomelinae
Moths described in 1879
Moths of Japan